The following highways are numbered 893:

United States